Kuhinjica (Serbian Cyrillic: Кухињица) is a popular culinary magazine in Serbia, published by Scorpion production. The first issue came out in April 2007. Besides the magazine, there are also a TV serial and a web site with more than 15.000 recipes.

References

Food and drink magazines
Magazines established in 2007
Monthly magazines
Magazines published in Serbia
Serbian-language magazines